Ermenegildo Florit (5 July 1901 – 8 December 1985) was an Italian cardinal of the Roman Catholic Church. He served as Archbishop of Florence from 1962 to 1977, and was elevated to the cardinalate in 1965.

Biography
Ermenegildo Florit was born in Fagagna, and attended the seminary in Udine, the Pontifical Roman Seminary, and the Pontifical Biblical Institute and Pontifical Lateran University in Rome. Before finishing his studies in 1927, he was ordained to the priesthood on 11 April 1925. Florit served as a professor (1929–1954) and later the dean of theology and vice-rector (1951–1954) at the Pontifical Lateran University, while also doing pastoral work in Rome. In 1951, he was made a canon of St. Mark's Basilica and, on 21 August, a domestic prelate of his holiness.

On 12 July 1954, Florit was appointed Coadjutor Archbishop of Florence and Titular Archbishop of Hierapolis in Syria. He received his episcopal consecration on the following 12 September from Cardinal Clemente Micara, with Archbishop Luigi Traglia and Bishop Emilio Pizzoni serving as co-consecrators, in the Lateran Basilica. Florit succeeded the late Elia Dalla Costa as Archbishop of Florence on 9 March 1962, and then attended the Second Vatican Council until 1965. During the council, he was heavily involved with the drafting of Dei verbum, the Dogmatic Constitution on Divine Revelation.

Pope Paul VI created him Cardinal-Priest of Regina Apostolorum in the consistory of 22 February 1965. In 1968, the cardinal engaged in a dispute with the popular Florentine priest Enzo Mazzi, whose rebellious attitude the former saw as a threat to "ecclesiastical unity". Resigning as Florence's archbishop on 3 June 1977, Florit was one of the cardinal electors who participated in the conclaves of August and October 1978, which selected Popes John Paul I and John Paul II respectively.

He died in Florence, at age 84, and is buried in the Basilica of Santa Maria del Fiore.

References

External links
Cardinals of the Holy Roman Church
Catholic-Hierarchy

1901 births
1985 deaths
People from Fagagna
20th-century Italian Roman Catholic archbishops
Roman Catholic archbishops of Florence
20th-century Italian cardinals
Participants in the Second Vatican Council
Cardinals created by Pope Paul VI
Pontifical Lateran University alumni
Pontifical Roman Seminary alumni
Pontifical Biblical Institute alumni